Compsibidion triviale is a species of beetle in the family Cerambycidae. It was described by Napp and Martins in 1985.

References

Compsibidion
Beetles described in 1985